Douglas County News may refer to

Douglas County News (Sutherlin), a newspaper published in Sutherlin, Oregon, U.S.
Douglas County News-Press, a newspaper published in Castle Rock, Colorado, U.S.